What follows is an illustrative list of a selection of Gustav Klimt's paintings and represents a chronological look at some of his main pictorial production. The arrangement is ordered by year and title, with brief comments and showing the Austrian painter's progress in artistic development.

Gallery of paintings by Gustav Klimt
{| class="wikitable"
|-
! Number !! Image !! Year & Title !! Comment
|-
|01 ||  || 1888 – Old Burgtheater in Vienna (oil on canvas, 82 cm × 93 cm) || This painting was made in honor of Gustavo Bentencita, Gustavo was a painter, who died on May 16th, 1876. The artist was mourning for those past 12 years. Currently, This painting belongs to The San Diego Art Museum 
|-
|02 ||  || 1888–1890 – Sappho (oil on canvas, 39 cm × 31.6 cm) || Representation of the Greek lyric poet born on the island of Lesbos. Still in the sketch stage, this painting fuses the Pre-Raphaelites' influence with the literary and dreamy symbolism of Moreau. Built on orthogonal lines, the canvas is pervaded by an allegoric mythology already present in Klimt's Burgtheater work. The detailed descriptive traits are a consequence of the period's historicism style, celebrating beauty in an atmosphere of refined archaism.
|-
|03 ||  || 1890 – Portrait of pianist Joseph Pembauer (oil on canvas, 65 cm × 55 cm) || A realistic portrait of pianist and piano teacher Joseph Pembauer. The face's photographic realism generates a subtle tension with the symbolism of the stylised elements. In this period, the stylistic dilemma tormenting Klimt between historicism and symbolism, is here resolved by the mediation of archaic forms, which attribute to Music (see also No. 5), as identified by the instruments, an absolute and eternal value.
|-
|03 || || 1894 - Portrait of a Woman (oil on canvas, 181 cm × 96.5 cm) || A realistic full-length portrait of a woman in a black dress, painted in 1893 or 1894. At least one source says it is a portrait of Marie Breunig. At least one source uses the title Portrait of a Lady in Black.
|-
|04 ||  || 1895 – Love (oil on canvas, 60 cm × 44 cm) || For its evanescent rarefaction the love scene reveals its symbolist mould. The work is part of Klimt's series of Allegories and Emblems, whose intent was to translate life's most significant moments, and its psychological nuances, into forms of metaphorical intensity.
|-
|05 ||  || 1895 – Music I (oil on canvas, 37 cm × 44.5 cm)|| Allegoric representation of Music, which Klimt painted several times in various renderings. Besides the lyre, symbol of music, this particular canvas emphasises the sphinx (alluding to artistic freedom), the Silenus mask on the extreme left, the lion's teeth at the centre (a metaphor of the spread of new ideas) and finally the woman's meditative face. 
|-
|06 ||  || 1898 – Portrait of Sonja Knips (oil on canvas, 141 cm × 141 cm) || With a style reminding of the Belgian artist Fernand Khnopff, Klimt paints a lady from the Viennese élite, who was active with her husband in the circle of the Wiener Werkstätte. The face's plasticity contrasts with the soft inconsistency of the fluffy dress. In this diagonal composition, the evanescence of the chair, the book's red blur, the head surrounded by flowers, all anticipate the portraits of the golden period.
|-
|07 ||  || 1898 – Pallas Athena (oil on canvas, 75 cm × 75 cm) || Enhanced by the golden frame created by Klimt's brother, Georg, the goddess Athena is portrayed in front of a frieze borrowed from a black-figure Attic vase of the 6th century BC. The red hair comes out of the helmet so as to underscore the goddess' femininity, notwithstanding her armour. Following the example of the Munich Secession, Athena is chosen as the patron numen of the Vienna Secession.
|-
|08 ||  || 1899 – Nuda Veritas (oil on canvas, 252 cm × 56.2 cm) || The frame's upper margin quotes a verse by Schiller, indicating, in its difficult consensus, a distinctive sign of quality: "If you can't please everyone with your deeds and your art – please only a few. To please many is bad. Schiller." Aim of this quote is to incite the Vienna Secession to action. Another version of this work exists as an etching for the magazine Ver Sacrum. The mirror held by Veritas is a modern invitation to "Know yourself", whereas the flowers are symbols of regeneration.
|-
|09 ||  || 1899 – Garden with chickens in St Agatha (oil on canvas, 80.3 cm × 40 cm) || Also titled After the rain, it was painted at Saint Agatha in Upper Austria and represents a pleasant exception in Klimt's gallery, for the animals it depicts. The oblong format and the particular photographic style affirm their Japanese derivation. The rainy mist enveloping the whole, as well as the ornamental interpretation of every element, recall Whistler's evenescent landscapes.
|-
|10 |||| 1901 – Judith and the Head of Holofernes, also known as Judith I (oil on canvas, 84 cm × 42 cm) || The painting depicts the biblical character of Judith holding the severed head of Holofernes. Judith's face exudes a mixed charge of voluptuousness and perversion. Its traits are transfigured so as to obtain the greatest degree of intensity and seduction, which Klimt achieves by placing the woman on an unattainable plane. Notwithstanding the alteration of features, one can recognise Klimt's friend and maybe lover Adele Bloch-Bauer, the subject of another two portraits respectively done in 1907 and 1912, and also painted in the Pallas Athena. The slightly lifted head has a sense of pride, whereas her visage is languid and sensual, with parted lips in between defiance and seduction. The contrast between the black hair and the golden luminosity of the background enhance elegance and exaltation. The fashionable hairdo is emphasized by the stylised motifs of the trees fanning on the sides.
|-
|11 ||  || 1902 – Beech Forest (oil on canvas, 100 cm × 100 cm) || The series of Klimt's beech forests corresponds to the one with lakes, created during the same period. repeated are the high horizon, the squarish format, the close-up perspective. The rhythmic disposition of trees, rather than creating optical confusion, plays on the colours' vividness and the trunks' slenderness, so that the viewer is immersed in the scenery.
|-
|12 ||  || 1901–1902 – Goldfish (oil on canvas, 181 cm × 66.5 cm) || Presented at the XIII Secession Exhibition and at Dresden in 1904, it created such a controversy that Klimt thought to rename it To my critics. The canvas has a symbolic intention and is dominated by the bare back, reminiscent of Rodin.
|-
|13 ||  || 1903 – Hope I (oil on canvas, 189.2 cm × 67 cm) || The unusual subject and its formal rendition created critical perplexity, so much so that, in order for Klimt to exhibit this work, he had to give it a religious interpretation. The pregnancy theme had already been present in one of the artist's figures in Medicine and the Beethoven Frieze. In 1907–08 Klimt will paint a second version, Hope II, this time with the pregnant woman wearing a highly stylised and geometric dress.
|-
|14 ||  || 1905 – The Three Ages of Woman (oil on canvas, 180 cm × 180 cm) || This painting won the Prize at the Esposizione d'Arte Internazionale of Rome in 1911 and the following year was purchased by the Roman Galleria Nazionale d'Arte Moderna. The canvas mixes a geometrising decorativism and an unexpected psychological introspection in the expressions of the three figures: the dramatic premonition of death in old age, the tender protectiveness of the young woman, and the contented sleep of the child.
|-
|15 ||  || 1906 – Portrait of Fritza Riedler (oil on canvas, 153 cm × 133 cm) || One of the most exhibited of Klimt's portraits, it represents the clearest example of his geometrising phase, with its diagonal compositional structure and the almost inconsistent dress. The suggestive contrast between the rhythmic repetition of the decorative symbols and the plasticity of face and hands, evoke the dialectic between figurativism and abstract style typical of this phase in the artist's development.
|-
|16 ||  || 1904–1907 – Water Snakes (mixed media on vellum, 50 cm x 20 cm) || Painted by using various techniques, from watercolour to tempera, to using gold leaf on parchment. The composition proposes stretched figures in slender shapes typical of the Jugendstil, but its central motif is the bombastic decoration of the golden period, played in the abstract yet allusive illustration of the embrace and the mosaic of open almonds.
|-
|17 ||  || 1903–1907 – Portrait of Adele Bloch-Bauer I (oil on canvas, 138 cm × 138 cm) || Both the current holder of the portrait—the Neue Galerie New York—and the art historian Elana Shapira describe how the background and gown contain symbols suggestive of erotica, including triangles, eggs, shapes of eyes and almonds.
|-
|18 ||  || 1907–1908 – The Kiss (oil on canvas, 180 cm × 180 cm) || A perfect square, the canvas depicts a couple embracing, their bodies entwined in elaborate robes decorated in a style influenced by both linear constructs of the contemporary Art Nouveau style and the organic forms of the earlier Arts and Crafts Movement.  The work is composed of conventional oil paint with applied layers of gold leaf, an aspect that gives it its strikingly modern, yet evocative appearance.  The painting is now in the Österreichische Galerie Belvedere museum in the Belvedere palace, Vienna, and is widely considered a masterpiece of the early modern period.  It is a symbol of Vienna Jugendstil—Viennese Art Nouveau—and is considered Klimt's most popular work.
|-
|19 ||  || 1907–1908 – Danaë (oil on canvas, 77 cm x 83 cm) || Representation of the mythological daughter of King Acrisius of Argos and his wife Queen Eurydice. Danaë was a popular subject in the early 1900s for many artists; she was used as the quintessential symbol of divine love, and transcendence. While imprisoned by her father, King of Argos, in a tower of bronze, Danaë was visited by Zeus, symbolized here as the golden rain flowing between her legs. It is apparent from the subject's face and hands that she is aroused by the golden stream. In this work, she is curled in a sumptuous royal purple veil which refers to her imperial lineage. Many early portrayals of Danaë were erotic; other paintings completed in similar style are Klimt's Medicine (1900– 1907), and No. 16, Water Snakes (1904–1907).
|-
|20 ||  || 1905–1909 – Tree of Life (carton/panel, 138.8 cm × 102 cm) || Central panel for the mural at the Palais Stoclet in Brussels. The interior of this building was decorated with marble paneling and artworks, and included the mosaic friezes by Klimt and the murals by Ludwig Heinrich Jungnickel. This integration of architects, artists, and artisans made Stoclet Palace an example of Gesamtkunstwerk, one of the defining characteristics of Jugendstil. The sketches of Klimt's work for the dining room can be found in the permanent collection of Museum für angewandte Kunst (MAK) in Vienna. The panel shows different influences, converging together: from the Byzantine mosaic art to the Japanese prints. But especially dominant is the Egyptian culture, in the posture of the figures and the iteration of the decorative motifs.
|-
|21 ||  || 1909–1910 – The Park (oil on canvas, 110.5 cm × 110.5 cm) || One of Klimt's paintings closer to abstraction, but not quite embracing it in full. The multiplicity of colours and reedy forms of vegetation infuse a sense of vivaciousness that connects with Nature's life cycle. The focus is a close-up subject, as often occurs in Klimt's landscapes, whereas the execution is reminiscent of exquisite mosaics.
|-
|22 ||  || 1910 – Lady with Feather Hat (oil on canvas, 79 cm × 63 cm) || Also known as Black Feather Hat, the red hair and the disproportionate hat were already present in Klimt's Lady with Hat and Feather Boa (1909). The unfinished style, unusual for the Austrian artist, seems to recall that of Toulouse-Lautrec, whose work was seen by Klimt in Paris the previous year: this is echoed by the synthesis of the image, lacking any decorative support, and its low tones.
|-
|23 ||  || 1908–1911 – Death and Life (oil on canvas, 178 cm × 198 cm) || The marked rupture cutting this composition in two parts represents several symbolic motifs: the disquieting and dark image of Death looms over the entangled group of the human bodies, where colour retrieves its decorative vividness. The ascending structure narrates life's salient motifs: from friendship to love, to maternity. The man's brawny physique will inspire Egon Schiele's nudes.
|-
|24 ||  || 1912–1913 – The Virgins (oil on canvas, 190 cm × 200 cm) || To his usual depiction of aristocracy, Klimt now substitutes erotic allegories, as for Life and Death (No. 22). Here the entanglement of women has lost any realism, as is apparent in the almost skeletal nude on the left, and thus it is absorbed in the decorative scheme. The association of beauty with such unnatural poses, indicates an allusion to life's ephemerality, a reflection of modern society.
|-
|25 ||  || 1914–1916 – Portrait of Baroness Elisabeth Bachofen-Echt (oil on canvas, 180 cm × 126 cm) || An oriental note dominates in the figurines framing the Baroness. To the pyramidal structure of the subject is accompanied an abstract and serrated syntax, typical of Klimt's last output. Having concluded his "golden phase" since 1909, and overcome the subsequent crisis, the artist rejects Greek or Egyptian modules and concentrates on a joyful chromatic vibrancy, close to Matisse.
|-
|26 ||  || 1916–1917 – Portrait of a Lady (oil on canvas, 60 cm × 55 cm) || Rendered in a brisk and vivacious style, the portrait is pervaded by a serene spirit, unusual for Klimt. Here he alters the face's realism with bright colour daubes, thus reaching an expressionist style, especially close to Jawlensky's images. However, to the lumpy and violent deformation of his colleagues' brush, Klimt opposes his usual ornamental finery.
|-
|27 ||  || 1916 – Portrait of Friederike Maria Beer (oil on canvas, 168 cm × 130 cm) || This woman, daughter of the Kaiserbar'''s owner, was also portrayed Egon Schiele. Klimt portrays her in a dress made by the Wiener Werkstätte. In order to emphasize its pompous style, he replicates the oriental elements of the Baroness at No. 24, taken from a Korean vase of hers. The three clorous at top right – red, white, and black – allude to the Austrian flag and the outbreak of World War I.
|-
|28 ||  || 1917–1918 – Portrait of Johanna Staude (oil on canvas, 70cm × 50 cm) || Another portrait, where Klimt concentrates on the body upper half, with an arlequin blue motif of leaves in the dress. Unfinished.
|-
|29 ||  || 1918 – Adam and Eve (oil on canvas, 173 cm × 60 cm) || Incomplete painting, it takes a symbolic significance for its biblical subject as well as Eve's facial rendering, with her reclined head and a sweet yet enigmagtic smile. The lower section, with its flowers and background decorativism, is typical of Klimt; the upper section, where the figures are contraposed to a monochrome backdrop, reveals a synthesis of strained lines closer to Schiele's style.
|}

References

Bibliography

 
 .
 .
 
 .
 .

Further reading

Chillida, Julio Vives. El Beso (Los Enamorados) de Gustav Klimt. Un Ensayo de Iconografía, Lulu.com, junio de 2008, .
Czernin, Hubertus. Die Fälschung: Der Fall Bloch-Bauer und das Werk Gustav Klimts. Czernin Verlag, Vienna 2006. 
Kallir, Jane, Alfred Weidinger: Gustav Klimt. In Search of the Total Artwork. Prestel, New York 2009, 
Schorske, Carl E. "Gustav Klimt: Painting and the Crisis of the Liberal Ego" in Fin-de-Siècle Vienna: Politics and Culture. Vintage Books, 1981. 
Weidinger, Alfred. Klimt. Catalogue Raisonné'', Prestel, New York, 2007,

External links

 Gallery of works by Gustav Klimt at Zeno.org 
 iKlimt.com
 Gustav Klimt on Wikipaintings, features all his artistic production.
 Web Museum Klimt page
 High resolution Klimt gallery

 
Art Nouveau works
Lists of paintings